Chiddingstone is a village and civil parish in the Sevenoaks District of Kent, England. The parish is located on the River Eden between Tonbridge and Edenbridge. The villages of Chiddingstone Causeway and Bough Beech and the hamlet Chiddingstone Hoath are also included in the parish. 

Chiddingstone is unique in that, apart from the church and Chiddingstone Castle, the entire village is owned by the National Trust, which describes it as "the best example of a Tudor village left in the country". It is an example of a Tudor one-street village.

History

Chiddingstone is mentioned in the Domesday Book. It was given to Bishop Odo in 1072 after the Norman invasion as part of his Earldom of Kent.

The first house was owned by Roger Attwood, constructed in the typical Kent style. Several villagers including Atwood took part in Jack Cade's rebellion of 1450, and were later pardoned.

The Castle Inn is a 15th-century building, which became a hostelry in 1730. It was visited by artists John Millais and Charles Rennie Mackintosh. Arthur Rackham also visited Chiddingstone.

The Streatfeild family were major landowners in the area, starting in 1584. In the early 1800s Henry Streatfeild changed the village significantly, diverting the road and demolishing some buildings.

The National Trust bought the village in 1939.

Parish church

St. Mary the Virgin, Chiddingstone is a large parish church which enhances the look of the village, and is perhaps the fourth built on that site. In the churchyard is a stone gazebo dating from 1736 built by Henry Streatfeild; leading down into the Streatfeild family vault beneath which has a through flow of air provided by vents in two false altar tombs, one adjacent to the gazebo and the other some 30 feet north.

The church was almost destroyed by a lightning fire in 1624. In recent years it has had new heating, lighting and sound systems installed. In addition to this, a chapel, at the base of the tower, has been constructed in 1979 with adjoining lavatory added in 2007.

Origin of name

A popular theory is that the village takes its name from a large sandstone rock formation, situated on its outskirts, named the Chiding Stone. Chidingstone was a previous spelling used for the village. The National Trust consider it more likely the name is derived from the homestead of Cidda's family, "Chidding tun". It was recorded as "Cidingstane" in the 12th century. The stone may have been used as a place to remonstrate overbearing local wives, a Druidical ritual site, or an Anglo-Saxon boundary marker.

The village today

The nearest available train station, Penshurst railway station, is located in the village of Chiddingstone Causeway. It is on the line between Tonbridge and Redhill.

There is a primary school, Chiddingstone Church of England School.

There are several nature reserves in the area including:
Sevenoaks Reserve and Jeffery Harrison Visitor Centre (Operated by Kent Wildlife Trust)
Bough Beech Visitors Centre and Reserve (Operated by Kent Wildlife Trust)
Chiddingstone Reserve (Operated by Kent Wildlife Trust)

There is a village shop and accompanying cafe called The Tulip Tree, popular with cyclists at the weekend.

Film location

The village was used as a setting in the 1985 Merchant Ivory film A Room with a View, in the scene where Lucy and Cecil take a walk after their engagement party. The High Street is seen from the end nearest to the Castle Inn.

Michael Winner used Chiddingstone in his production of The Wicked Lady.
Terry Jones and the Monty Python team filmed here for Wind in the Willows - Mr Toad's Wild Ride. 
Elizabeth R, starring Glenda Jackson was largely made here, as was Gerald Scarfe's Life of Hogarth.

References

External links

National Trust webpage
History of Chiddingstone
Village net article
The Castle Inn
Historic Kent article
Roughwood's image gallery and historical notes
Transcription of an article from the March 1894 edition of the Century Monthly Magazine describing the parish (with images)

Villages in Kent
Civil parishes in Kent
National Trust properties in Kent
Streatfeild family